Prysten House is a Grade I listed 15th century merchant's house situated close to St Andrew's Church in the city of Plymouth, England. It is a large U-shaped three storey split level house built  1498 and extended 1635.

Construction
It is constructed from Plymouth limestone rubble using relieving arches with Dartmoor granite hooded and ogee-framed Tudor dressings to glazed window openings, dry Devon slate roofs and  two original lateral chimney stacks. The front has a distinctive and fine granite transomed bay window arrangement over a decorated and hooded doorway.

History
The building is owned by Plymouth City Council and has been used as a museum and a restaurant, but contrary to the misnomer has never been a priest's house, its name originating simply from its close proximity to St Andrew's Church, Plymouth.

Prysten House is home to the Plymouth Tapestry designed by Eric Mor and displays a model of Plymouth in 1620.  the museum is not open to the public, but the restaurant is open.

Prysten House also features the "Door of Unity" commemorating the War of 1812.

See also
Grade I listed buildings in Plymouth

References

Grade I listed buildings in Devon
Buildings and structures in Plymouth, Devon